Vera Cruz is a municipality in the Brazilian state of  Rio Grande do Sul. It was founded on 07 June 1959 and it has a population of 27,099 as of 2020.

See also
List of municipalities in Rio Grande do Sul

References

Municipalities in Rio Grande do Sul